Arturo Avilés may refer to:

 Arturo Avilés (footballer, born 1961), Mexican football manager and former defender
 Arturo Avilés (footballer, born 1994), Mexican football defender